Byzantine is an American heavy metal band from Charleston, West Virginia, that was formed in 2000. As of March 2016, the band consists of front-man and co-founder Chris "OJ" Ojeda (rhythm guitar and vocals), Brian Henderson (guitar), Matt Bowles (drums) and Ryan Postlethwait (bass guitar). The band has released three studio albums on Prosthetic Records along with two independent albums. Byzantine is known for its unique sound and modern, "forward thinking" musical style which explores different musical territories and song structures.

The band split on January 26, 2008, one day after the release of their third album, due to various circumstances, but reunited in 2010. On March 31, 2016, Metal Blade Records announced that they had signed the band to a worldwide deal and that they would be releasing a new album on July 28, 2017.

History 
Byzantine was formed in the spring of 2000 by bassist Chris "Cid" Adams, lead guitarist Tony Rohrbough, drummer Jeremy Freeman, and vocalist/rhythm guitarist Chris "OJ" Ojeda after their former bands, New Family and Temper, disbanded. Byzantine wrote four songs, then seven more songs were written, and 2000-2001 Demos was recorded and self-released in 2001. Soon after, Byzantine became a part of the local West Virginian heavy metal scene.

Subsequently, the band recruited local musician Matt Wolfe as a drummer. Ten songs featuring Wolfe were recorded in 2003 at Broadmoor Studios in Huntington, West Virginia and were released as The Broadmoor Demo, arousing the interest of Lamb of God's drummer Chris Adler. Byzantine then had a short East Coast tour with Lamb of God. This tour helped them obtain new fans and a deal with Prosthetic Records.

Soon after Byzantine released their debut album The Fundamental Component in February 2004, which introduced the band's trademark sound. Subsequently, Byzantine toured with Lamb of God and Shadows Fall as well as playing the main stage of New England Metal and Hardcore Festival in 2004 (and later in 2006). Chris "Cid" Adams was soon fired, and Byzantine returned to the studio to record their second album in 2005: ...And They Shall Take Up Serpents, with Tony Rohrbough taking over bass duties in the studio. The album received high praise both abroad and domestically.

A 2007 fan-oriented DVD titled Salvation, featuring exclusive material, scenes, in-studio clips, interviews, the uncut version of the "Jeremiad" music video and the performance of the never-before released "Cradle Song", increased the band's popularity. On January 22, 2008, the band's third studio album Oblivion Beckons was released. The band announced its break up one day after the release.

In March 2010, the band reunited and played local shows around West Virginia. The band members insisted that they had returned with the intention of carrying on Byzantine. However, it was announced on August 17, 2010, that original guitarist and founding member Tony Rohrbough would leave with the group. Brian Henderson then filled his role.

On January 26, 2012, it was announced the band was reunited with original lead guitarist Tony Rohrbough and had plans to record another album, which was to be self-funded. On February 26, 2013, their self-titled album was released. Bassist Michael "Skip" Cromer left the band due to finding religion.

On May 29, 2014, it was publicized that Byzantine would be recording their fifth album that September when producer Jay Hannon returned to West Virginia with new guitarist Brian Henderson and new bassist Sean Sydnor. On April 7, 2015, the studio album To Release Is to Resolve was released independently by Byzantine for the second time.

In March 2016, the band announced on media that they had signed a 4 record contract with metal powerhouse label Metal Blade Records. It was announced that the band would begin recording in late summer 2016 for a spring 2017 release. The band finally entered the studio, once again working with Producer Jay Hannon. Byzantine recorded at Byzantine Studios and 7 over 8 Studios. The release date of The Cicada Tree was pushed from spring to June 2 and ultimately was released on 28 July 2017. Byzantine then set out on their 1st true North American tour from mid September to October 2017, in support of thrash metal band Sacred Reich. Byzantine also introduced a new level of crowd interaction as a Tier on their Pledge Music drive. They gave 1 fan the option to buy a tier that allowed them to pick 75% of that night's set list. The Byz Boss was well received by concert goers.

Musical style, influences and lyrical themes 

Byzantine plays progressive thrash, which was compared by Decibel Magazine to Testament and Megadeth, with power groove moves comparable to Meshuggah or Lamb of God, and occasional clean vocals. The band's former record label, Prosthetic Records, has also compared them to Pantera. Byzantine plays technical metal and retro-minded Bay Area thrash. Their music has been described as simultaneously melodic and aggressive. Byzantine also occasionally incorporates instrumental parts in their songs and spoken word vocals. The guitar solos alone move from fast parts to progressive to jazz. The band also uses acoustic guitar and tribal-esque drum beats.

Byzantine plays very modern metal, exploring different musical territories or song structures, and has been labeled as a "forward-thinking" band. Growing up in West Virginia has helped Byzantine develop a unique sound. "We are quite alienated from any big scene", explains Ojeda. "Therefore, we tend to think for ourselves a lot more when writing material."

The Gauntlet states "The Fundamental Component is characterized by long songs, melodic thrash and Tony Rohrbough's scathing guitar solos while still embracing technical chaos and the violent groove of bassist Chris Adams and drummer Matt Wolfe." Byzantine singer/guitarist Chris Ojeda says "I think we have a knack for achieving a good balance of chaos and melody". Liz Ciavarella from Metal Maniacs magazine uses formulations such as "Scrupulous time-shifts and placed off-beats; forever infectious grooves, breakdowns (Thrashdowns?) and ceaseless experimentation that end in intricate catchy Metal mantras" to describe Byzantine's style.

Byzantine frontman Chris Ojeda, who plays guitar while singing, is considered to be in the tradition of James Hetfield, Dave Mustaine, Max Cavalera, Mikael Akerfeldt, and Chuck Schuldiner.

Lyrically the band is influenced by such bands as Meshuggah, Carcass and Opeth and focuses on problems indigenous to their home, such as religion in American society.

Band members

Current members 

 Chris "OJ" Ojeda – lead vocals, rhythm guitar (2000–present)
 Brian Henderson – lead guitar (2010, 2013–present), backing vocals (2013–present)
 Matt Bowles – drums (2016–present)
 Ryan Postlethwait - bass (2018–present)

Former members 
 Jeremy Freeman - drums (2000-2002)
 Matt Wolfe – drums (2002–2015) (died 2021)
 Chris "Cid" Adams – bass (2000–2004)
 Michael "Skip" Cromer – bass (2004–2013)
 Tony Rohrbough – lead guitar (2000–2013)
 Sean Sydnor – bass (2013–2018)

Timeline

Discography

Studio albums 

 The Fundamental Component – (2004, Prosthetic Records)
 ...And They Shall Take Up Serpents – (2005, Prosthetic Records)
 Oblivion Beckons – (2008, Prosthetic Records)
 Byzantine – (2013, self-released)
 To Release Is to Resolve – (2015, self-released)
 The Cicada Tree – (2017, Metal Blade Records)

Extended plays 

 Black Sea Codex – (2022, WV Snakepit)

Demos 

 2000-2001 Demos – (2001, Caustic Eye Productions)
 Broadmoor – (2003, full-length demo, also known as European Sampler, DK Entertainment/KMS)

Other 

The band was featured on two tribute albums in which they recorded an exclusive cover song for each.

 On Your Knees: The Tribute To Judas Priest – (2007, Crimson Mask Records)
 For the Sick, a tribute to Eyehategod – (2007, Emetic Records)

Videography 

 Jeremiad: A Video by Donnie Searls – (2006, Mini-DVD, Atma)
 Salvation – (2007, DVD, Prosthetic Records)
 "Soul Eraser" – (2013)
 The Agonies – (2015, Screaming Butterfly Entertainment, directed by Holly Siders, MA, MFA)
 You Sleep, We Wake (Lyric Video) – (2015, Screaming Butterfly Entertainment, directed and animated by Holly Siders, MA, MFA)
 Justinian Code – (2016, Screaming Butterfly Entertainment, directed by Holly Siders, MA, MFA)
 New Ways to Bear Witness - (2017, Screaming Butterfly Entertainment)

References

External links 

 Byzantine at MySpace.com
 Byzantine at Prosthetic Records
 Byzantine: Official Site

American groove metal musical groups
American progressive metal musical groups
American thrash metal musical groups
Heavy metal musical groups from West Virginia
Musical groups established in 2000
Musical groups disestablished in 2008
Musical groups reestablished in 2010
Musical quartets
Musicians from Charleston, West Virginia
Musical groups from West Virginia